= Horishnyi =

Horishnyi (Ukrainian: Горішний) is a Ukrainian surname. It means top, upper or located on the top.

It may refer to:

- Vasyl Horishnyi, a Ukrainian politician, communist, member of Verkhovna Rada
